Paszkiewicz is a Polish-language surname. It originates from Paskevich, a Belarusian surname, which ultimately comes from the East Slav personal name Pashka, a diminutive of  Pavel (Paul). The ending -kiewicz indicates the Belarusian language influence. Surnames of this form started appearing since 16th-17th centuries.

Notable people with this surname include:

Gustaw Paszkiewicz (1892-1955)
Kazimierz Paszkiewicz (1935-1980)
Ludwik Witold Paszkiewicz (1907-1940)
Romuald Paszkiewicz (1941-2003)

See also
Paskevich for other variants

References

Polish-language surnames
Belarusian-language surnames